Paraguayo may refer to
 a national of Paraguay
 Uncaria guianensis, cat's claw, a plant species in the genus Uncaria
 Saturn Peach, Prunus persica var. platycarpa, also known as donut peach
 Colloquial name for marihuana prensada